The 2020–21 Coupe de France preliminary rounds, Bourgogne-Franche-Comté was the qualifying competition to decide which teams from the leagues of the Bourgogne-Franche-Comté region of France took part in the main competition from the seventh round.

A total of seven teams qualified from the Bourgogne-Franche-Comté Preliminary rounds. In 2019–20, ASM Belfort progressed furthest in the main competition, reaching the quarter-finals before losing to Rennes 0–3.

Schedule
A total of 397 teams entered from the region. The draw therefore required a Preliminary round involving six clubs, before the first round, where the remaining 373 clubs from District and Regional leagues entered. The draw for the preliminary and first rounds was made on 13 July 2020.

The third round draw, which saw the entry of the teams from Championnat National 3, was made on 8 September 2020. The fourth round draw, which saw the entry of the teams from Championnat National 2, was made on 22 September 2020. The fifth round draw was made on 6 October 2020. The sixth round draw was made on 20 October 2020.

Preliminary round
These matches were played on 21 and 22 August 2020.

First round
These matches were played on 29 and 30 August 2020, with one replayed 13 September 2020.

Second round
These matches were played on 5 and 6 September 2020, with one postponed until 19 September 2020.

Third round
These matches were played on 19 and 20 September 2020, with one match postponed until 27 September 2020.

Fourth round
These matches were played on 3 and 4 October 2020, with one postponed to 10 October and one postponed to 11 October.

Fifth round
These matches were played on 17 and 18 October 2020, with two postponed to 21 and 25 October 2020.

Sixth round
These matches were played on 31 January 2021.

References

Preliminary rounds